George Angus Takeli (born 1959) is a Solomon Islands Anglican bishop. He has been Archbishop and Primate of the Anglican Church of Melanesia and Bishop of the Diocese of Central Melanesia since his enthronement in 17 April 2016. He was first married to Lilian, who died in 2014. He got married a second time to June in December 2015.

Ecclesiastical career
He was ordained an Anglican priest in 1995. He was undertaking a D.D. in Theology at Charles Stuart University in Australia, when he was elected the fourth bishop of the Diocese of Temotu on August 2009. He also has a M.D. in Theology from the University of Auckland in New Zealand.

He was elected the sixth Archbishop and Primate of Melanesia, in Honiara, at 12 February 2016. He was enthroned at St. Barnabas Provincial Cathedral, in Honiara, at 17 April 2016.

References

External links
George Takeli is new Archbishop of Melanesia, Anglican Communion News Service, 12 February 2016

1959 births
Living people
Solomon Islands Anglicans
20th-century Anglican bishops in Oceania
21st-century Anglican archbishops
Anglican archbishops of Melanesia